is a Japanese impressionist (monomane tarento).

Kokubu is represented with Big World.

Biography
Kokubu started doing impressions when he was at a classroom sideshow in middle school.

When he worked as a salesperson at a precision instrument measuring manufacturer, he was joined with an acquaintance at the impressionist live house Sokkuri Tate Kisara at Shinjuku, Tokyo, this triggered him to start doing impressions on stage. Kokubu's first impression at Kisara was the members of Kome Kome Club.

While working as both as a salesman and an impressionist, he felt that he prefer impressions more, and later retire from being a salesman to concentrate on his impressions. Kokubu originally doing impressions of the Kome Kome Club members, he gradually increased his repertoire. In about two and a half years after his debut at Kisara, he became a regular of Bakushō sokkuri monomane Kōhaku Uta Gassen Special.

Later in 2008 Kokubu was nickname  when he appeared in Enta no Kamisama, in which he made an impression of former Japanet Takata president Akira Takata. He was later appointed for the advertisements of Japanet Takata from January to March 2009, in which he played alongside Takata himself.

In the 28 December 2012 broadcast of Nihonichi wa Dareda? Monomane Ōzakettei-sen: Saikyō Tournament Chō Gekokujō Special, Kokubu was placed first during his second appearance.

He continued to participate in Monomane Ōzakettei-sen, he won the final game for three consecutive years from 2013 to 2015, but he missed the championship.

Impressions
Kokubu mainly did singing impressions.
Ryuichi Kawamura
K
Sachiko Kobayashi
Shōsuke Tanihara
Hideaki Tokunaga
Motohiro Hata
Kiyoshi Hikawa
Ken Hirai
Akira Fuse
Bae Yong-joon
Takashi Hosokawa
Noriyuki Makihara
Hibari Misora
Yoshikazu Mera
Naotarō Moriyama
Masayoshi Yamazaki
Tatsuro Yamashita
During his initial appearance in Bakushō sokkuri monomane Kōhaku Uta Gassen Special, he appeared as Yamashita's look-alike.

Filmography

Regular appearances

Irregular appearances

Dubbing

TV drama

Advertisements

Former appearances

Discography
As Beauty Kokubu

As Hideyuki Kokubu

References

Japanese impressionists (entertainers)
Japanese male voice actors
Male actors from Tokyo
Comedians from Tokyo
1973 births
Living people
21st-century Japanese male actors